This is the inaugural season of Hell's Kitchen. Season 1 aired starting on May 30, 2005 and concluded on August 1, 2005. The series was filmed over 3 weeks in November 2004. Michael Wray from Fort Collins, Colorado, won the first season of Hell's Kitchen, thus winning his own restaurant in Los Angeles named Tatou (he was offered to go to London to work under Gordon Ramsay, but later declined due to family reasons).  This was the first season where the teams were not separated by gender at the start, which wouldn't happen again until season 18. This was also the only season where Ramsay addressed the show's progress on camera to the viewers, rather than just a voice-over explaining eliminations.

The show was taped in Los Angeles at KCOP, in a converted former television broadcast facility that previously hosted shows such as The Joker's Wild and Tic-Tac-Dough in the late 1970s to mid-1980s.

Sous chefs and Maître d'hôtel
 Sous chefs – Scott Leibfried and Mary-Ann Salcedo
 Maître d'hôtel – Jean-Philippe Susilovic

Chefs
The 12 contestants were initially divided into the Blue team and the Red team, but not based on gender as in all the following seasons (exceptions being seasons 18 and 21). The contestants were:

Contestant progress
Each week, the best member from the losing team during the latest service period ("least bad" as determined by Ramsay) is asked to nominate two of their teammates for elimination; one of these two is sent home by Gordon Ramsay.

 *Mary Ellen and Chris were supposed to join but couldn't, so Dewberry and Wendy replaced them.

Episodes
Each episode consisted of a challenge with a reward, a service, and an elimination.

Notes

References

Hell's Kitchen (American TV series)
2005 American television seasons